The Eisner Award for Best Writer is an award for "creative achievement" in American comic books.

Winners and nominees

See also
 Eisner Award for Best Publication for Early Readers
 Eisner Award for Best Academic/Scholarly Work
 Eisner Award for Best Cover Artist
 Eisner Award for Best Coloring
 Eisner Award for Best Lettering

Notes

Multiple awards and nominations

The following individuals have won Best Writer one or more times:

The following individuals have received two or more nominations but never won Best Writer:

References

Writer
1988 establishments in the United States
Annual events in the United States
Awards established in 1988